The 1952 All England Championships was a badminton tournament held at the Empress Hall, Earls Court, London, England, from 19 to 22 March 1952.

Final results

Over 200 entries were received for the 1952 championships, a record.

Men's singles

Section 1

Section 2

+ Denotes seeded player

Women's singles

References

All England Open Badminton Championships
All England Badminton Championships
All England Open Badminton Championships in London
All England Championships
All England Badminton Championships
All England Badminton Championships